Pekka Saarenheimo (born May 6, 1982) is a Finnish professional ice hockey centre who currently plays for Södertälje SK of the Elitserien.

Career statistics

References

External links

Living people
Södertälje SK players
1982 births
Lahti Pelicans players
Finnish ice hockey centres
Oulun Kärpät players
Lukko players
Tingsryds AIF players
Mikkelin Jukurit players
Sportspeople from North Ostrobothnia